Time of Dust is a mini album by British musician Ed Harcourt. It was released in January 2014 under CCCLX Music.

Track listing

References

2014 albums
Ed Harcourt albums